The Porsche 991 is the internal designation for the seventh generation of the Porsche 911 sports car, which was unveiled at the 2011 Frankfurt Motor Show on 15 September as the replacement for the 997. The 991 was an entirely new platform, only the third since the original 911 launched in 1963 (the 996 of 1999 was the second new platform). Production of the 991 generation ended on December 20, 2019, with 233,540 units produced.

Design 

A new transaxle was developed so that the rear wheels could be moved  backward in relation to the position of the engine, which significantly improves the weight distribution and cornering performance of the car.

PDK is available as an option for all 911 Carrera and 911 Turbo (991.1 Non S) models as a 7-speed transmission, featuring manual and automatic modes. Gears 1 to 6 have a sports ratio and top speed is reached in 6th gear. 7th gear has a long ratio and helps to reduce fuel consumption by keeping engine revs low. The PDK is essentially two gearboxes merged into a single unit and thus requires two clutches. For all 991 models, the PDK is produced by ZF Friedrichshafen. The auto start/stop function is standard on all variants of the 911 Carrera.

First phase (2011–2016) (991.1)

911 Carrera and Carrera S (2011–2015) 

The convertible variant of the 991 was announced in both Carrera and Carrera S versions at the LA Motor Show in November 2011.

In September 2012 at the Paris Motor Show, the all-wheel-drive variants, the Carrera 4 and 4S, were added to the 991 lineup.

911 Carrera GTS (2014–2016) 
Introduced in November 2014 at the LA Motor Show, the 991 Carrera GTS sits between the Carrera S and GT3. The 2016 model year also brought about the Rennsport Reunion Edition, limited to 25 cars, which featured a Fashion Grey livery and a  naturally aspirated 3.8-liter flat-six engine available exclusively with a manual transmission. It also included 18-way power sports seats, PASM adaptive suspension, Bose audio system, rear parking sensors, carbon-fiber dashboard trim, 20-inch sport classic wheels, adaptive headlights (PDLS, or Porsche Dynamic Light System), and a host of decals for the hood, doors, roof, and decklid plus a key fob painted the same Fashion Gray as the car, and a special leather case for the key with “911 Carrera GTS Rennsport Reunion Edition” lettering.

911 Carrera GTS Club Coupe (2016) 

The Club Coupe was introduced to celebrate the 60th anniversary of the Porsche Club of America. Just 60 Club Coupes were produced for the 2016 model year. Notable changes from the standard GTS include 20" alloy wheels (the same as those found on the 2014 50th Anniversary Edition) which pays homage to the "Fuchs"-style wheels on classic 911s, special "Club Blau" exterior paint, SportDesign bodywork, and a "ducktail"-style spoiler which references classic motorsports-oriented 911s, for example the Carrera RS 2.7. The interior features Club Coupe-specific dashboard trim, door sills, and center console lid.

The Club Coupe had an MSRP of $136,060 excluding destination fee and was only available to Porsche Club of America members.

911 50th Anniversary Edition (2014) 

To commemorate the 50th anniversary of the 911's introduction, Porsche introduced the 911 50th Anniversary Edition at the 2013 Frankfurt Motor Show for the 2014 model year. 1,963 individually-numbered examples were produced. The 50th Anniversary Edition was based on the Carrera S, including the standard 400PS/394 hp 3.8L flat-6 and standard 7-speed manual with the 7-speed PDK transmission an available option. Contrary to the standard Carrera S, however, the 50th Anniversary Edition featured the Porsche Active Suspension Management system and Porsche Torque Vectoring as standard equipment. The optional Powerkit increased the engine's output to 430PS/424 hp.

Cosmetically, the 50th Anniversary Edition featured the wider body of the Carrera 4S, 10mm lower suspension, special 20" alloy wheels which reference the iconic Fuchs wheels on classic 911s, chrome trim across the body including the vents on the rear engine cover and window trim, standard SportDesign side mirrors, and a special "911 50" rear badge. Three colors were available: Geyser Grey, Graphite Grey, and black monochrome. On the interior, the 50th Anniversary Edition has vintage-style green instrument dials, white instrument dial needles, retro "houndstooth" seat inserts, and a badge on the trim above the glovebox commemorating the special edition and listing the production number of the vehicle.

The 50th Anniversary Edition carried an MSRP of €121,119 including VAT or £92,257, and was only made available to current Porsche owners.

911 Targa 4 and 4S (2014–2016) 

At the Detroit Motor Show in January 2014, Porsche introduced the Targa 4 and Targa 4S models. These new derivatives come equipped with an all-new roof technology with the original targa design, now with an electronically operated soft top along with the original B-pillar and the glass 'dome' at the rear.

On 12 January 2015, Porsche announced the 911 Targa 4 GTS at the North American International Auto Show in Detroit. Similar in appearance to the existing Targa 4 and 4S models, the GTS added the  engine plus several otherwise optional features.

911 GT3 (2013–2015) 

The GT3 variant was added to the 991 line up at the 2013 Geneva Motor Show equipped with Porsche's new active rear wheel steering. The system is claimed to provide higher lateral dynamics than previously available by the manufacturer. Car speed inputs determine whether the rear wheels steer in the same or opposite direction of the front wheels. It is the first GT3 model to be offered with an automatic transmission.

At the start of 2014, deliveries of the GT3 were halted following two incidents of the car catching fire. A subsequent recall to replace the engines of all 785 cars manufactured at that time was announced in March 2014 before production of the GT3 would restart.

911 GT3 RS (2015–2016) 

Porsche launched the RS version of the 991 GT3 at the Geneva Motor Show in 2015. Compared to the 991 GT3, the front fenders are now equipped with louvers above the wheels and the rear fenders now include intakes taken from the 911 Turbo, rather than an intake below the rear wing. The roof is made from magnesium. The interior includes full bucket seats (based on the carbon seats of the 918 Spyder), carbon-fibre inserts, lightweight door handles and the Club Sport Package as standard (a bolted-on roll cage behind the front seats, preparation for a battery master switch, and a six-point safety harness for the driver and fire extinguisher with mounting bracket).

The transmission is PDK only. The 991 GT3 RS also comes with functions such as declutching by "paddle neutral" — comparable to pressing the clutch with a conventional manual gearbox – and a Pit Speed limiter button. As with the 991 GT3, there is rear-axle steering and Porsche Torque Vectoring Plus system with fully variable rear axle differential lock.

911 R (2016) 

The 911 R comes only with a 6-speed manual transmission, and has a top speed of  due to a lower drag coefficient as compared to the GT3 RS. It also offers additional options including a lighter flywheel and removal of the air conditioning and audio systems. Production was limited to 991 examples, as a 2016 model.

911 Turbo and Turbo S (2012–2016) 

Both of the versions have all-wheel drive. The Turbo and Turbo S was available exclusively with 7-speed PDK. The Turbo S can reach  in 2.9 seconds as claimed by Porsche but has achieved 2.6 seconds by many car magazine tests. New technologies featuring adaptive aerodynamics and rear wheel steering are included as standard.

The Turbo Cabriolet and the Turbo S Cabriolet were introduced in early 2013.

Engines

Performance 

PDK = Porsche Doppelkupplung (Dual Clutch Transmission)
SC = Sport Chrono

Second phase (2015–2019) (991.2)
Following an introduction at the 2015 Frankfurt Motor Show, the 991 received a mid-cycle facelift for the 2016 model year. The updated Porsche 911 (at Porsche internally referred to as 991.2 or 991 II) introduced new styling including updated front and rear bumpers, new dual exhaust pipes along with new head and tail lights and options, along with all new, 3.0-litre twin-turbocharged flat-six engines across the range. This marked the first time the base 911 models had turbocharged engines.

911 Carrera and Carrera S (2015–2019) 

Initially from October 2015, available models were the coupé and cabriolet versions of Carrera and Carrera S. The all-wheel drive versions Carrera 4 and 4S were unveiled in December 2015.

911 Carrera T (2017–2019) 

In October 2017, Porsche announced the 911 Carrera T (Touring), offering the base Carrera drivetrain but with shorter rear axle ratio, mechanical differential lock, PASM Sport lowered suspension, Sport Chrono package and sports exhaust as standard. Additional features include a reduced sound insulation, light-weight glass side/rear windows, Sport-Tex seats, a shortened shift lever, deletion of the rear seats and communication system (with their re-addition available as a no-cost option), Carrera S wheels, as well as optional rear-wheel steering, PDK transmission and bucket seats.

911 Targa 4 and 4S (2016–2019) 

The Targa 4 and 4S were unveiled in December 2015.

911 Carrera/Targa 4 GTS (2017–2019) 

In January 2017, five new GTS versions (RWD coupé and cabriolet as well as AWD coupé, cabriolet and Targa) were launched.

911 GT3 and GT3 Touring Package (2017–2019) 

The 2017 GT3 was unveiled at the 2017 Geneva Motor Show, and has a 4.0-litre flat-six engine, aerodynamic upgrades, and an optional 6-speed manual gearbox (absent on the 991.1-phase GT3). The 911 GT3 Touring followed in September 2017, with a manual transmission and without a fixed rear wing.

911 GT3 RS (2018–2019) 

In February 2018, Porsche unveiled the new GT3 RS, available with optional Weissach package with the official unveiling taking place at the 2018 Geneva Motor Show.

911 GT2 RS (2017–2019) 

The 911 GT2 RS was officially launched by Porsche at the 2017 Goodwood Festival of Speed along with the introduction of the 911 Turbo S Exclusive Series. A Weissach package option is available.

In late September 2017, the GT2 RS set a 6:47.3 lap time around the Nürburgring, which made it the fastest Porsche road car lap time recorded on the track at the time.

911 Turbo, Turbo S and Turbo S Exclusive Series (2016–2019) 

In December 2015, Turbo and Turbo S versions were launched. In June 2017, the Turbo S Exclusive Series with powerkit and CFRP body panels was launched, limited to 500 units. Braided carbon-fibre wheels were available as option.

935 (2019) 

At the Porsche Rennsport Reunion VI held in September 2018, Porsche unveiled a limited edition track-only special paying homage to the legendary 935 race car.

The 3.8-litre twin-turbocharged flat-six engine as used on the GT2 RS is untouched and generates . Power is sent to the rear wheels via a 7-speed dual clutch transmission with dual mass flywheel. The car retains ABS and Porsche Electronic Stability Management System including a full defeat mode. Unlike most racing cars air conditioning is standard-equipment. A passenger seat as well as a Martini sponsor-livery inspired by the original 935/78 are available as an option.

Production of the 935 was limited to 77 units with deliveries starting in June 2019.

911 Speedster (2019) 

At the 2018 Paris Motor Show held in October on the occasion of the 70th anniversary celebration of the marque, Porsche unveiled the Speedster variant of the 991 generation for the 911, as a concept. The car also features the signature "hump" shaped double bubble roof cover along with a shorter windshield frame, side window glass and the analogue roof folding mechanism retaining the "Talbot" wing mirrors and the central fuel cap from the 911 Speedster concept unveiled earlier at the Goodwood Festival of Speed harking back to its use on the 356 Speedster. Other highlights include a leather interior with perforated seats, red tinted daytime running lights, carbon fibre fenders, engine cover and hood and stone guards. Production will begin in the first half of 2019 and be limited to 1,948 units in honour of the year in which the 356 "Number 1" gained its operating license.

The final production version of the Speedster was unveiled at the 2019 New York Auto Show in April and dropped the "Talbot" wing mirrors in favour of standard 991 wing mirrors and announced to be available for sale in May 2019. The exhaust system is claimed to be  lighter despite the addition of two petrol particle filters. The car is equipped with carbon-ceramic brakes (PCCB) as standard, a Heritage Design Package is available as option.

The Speedster was also the final edition of the 991, with only 1,948 units produced. Production of the 991 generation ended on December 20, 2019, and the final 991 model was a 991 Speedster. Porsche made 233,540 991s worldwide.

The last unit of the Speedster was auctioned off in April 2020.

Engines

Performance 

SC = Sport Chrono

Marketing
Porsche Design 911 Soundbar Final Edition, a series of 50 speakers that uses the exhaust system of 991 series of 911 GT3, was sold via local Porsche Centre.

Awards 
The Porsche 991 was titled World Performance Car 2012 shortly after famed Porsche designer Ferdinand Alexander Porsche died. The GT3 was awarded the title of World Performance Car Of The Year in 2014.

References

External links 

Official Porsche website

All-wheel-drive vehicles
Cars introduced in 2011
Cars powered by boxer engines
Convertibles
Coupés
Police vehicles
991
Rear-engined vehicles
Rear-wheel-drive vehicles
Sports cars
Vehicles with four-wheel steering